is a Japanese actress.

Appearances

Films
 Rebirth of Mothra (1996), Lora
 Tokimeki Memorial (1997), Mishio Yokoyama
 Rebirth of Mothra II (1997), Lora
 Rebirth of Mothra III (1998), narration only
 Tomie: Replay (2000), Yumi Morita
 Kenchō no Hoshi (2006), Mika Tahata
 Gigolo Wannabe (2006)
 Cheke Raccho!! (2006), Mina Haebaru
 Nonchan Noriben (2009), Reika Tamagawa
 Nodame Cantabile Saishū Gakushō Zenpen (2009), Yūko Namiki
 Nodame Cantabile Saishū Gakushō Kouhen (2010), Yūko Namiki
 Softboy (2010)
 Rāmen Samurai (2011)
 Soup: Umare Kawari no Monogatari (2012)
 Flare (2014)
 April Fools (2015), Eriko Etō
 Rin (2018), Nozomi Satonaka
 The House Where the Mermaid Sleeps (2018), Miharu
 The Confidence Man JP: The Movie (2019)
 Threads: Our Tapestry of Love (2020), Mayumi Sonoda
 Tomorrow's Dinner Table (2021), Nana Wakasugi
 What She Likes... (2021), Mizuki
 Will I Be Single Forever? (2021)
 Radiation House: The Movie (2022)
 My Happy Marriage  (2023), Kanoko Saimori
 See Hear Love (2023), Megumi Tōyama

TV dramas
 Wakamono no Subete (Fuji TV, 1994)
 Oishī Kankei (Fuji TV, 1996), Yumi Mori
 Purple Eyes in the Dark (TV Asahi, 1997), Maiko Ozaki
 Futari: Wherever You Are (TV Asahi, 1997)
 Kōritsuku Natsu (YTV, 1998), Eriko Oikawa
 Kawaī Dakeja Dame Kashira? (TV Asahi, 1999), Setsuko Taniguchi
 Gekka no Kishi (TV Asahi, 2000), Mayumi Tachihara
 Hanamura Daisuke (KTV, 2000)
 Koi Suru Top Lady (KTV, 2002), Mari
 My Little Chef Episode 4 (TBS, 2002), Aki Ejima
 Engimono Machine Nikki (Fuji TV, 2003), Sachiko
 Boku to Kanojo to Kanojo no Ikiru Michi (KTV, 2004), Mami Tsuboi
 Water Boys 2 (Fuji TV, 2004), Natsuko Ōhara
 Wakaba (NHK, 2005), Aki Fujikura
 Anego (NTV, 2005), Kana Saotome
 Shimokita Sundays (TV Asahi, 2006), Akiko Emoto
 14-sai no Haha (NTV, 2006), Kōko Endō
 Kekkon Hirōen: Jinsei Saiaku no 3-jikan (Fuji TV, 2007), Yukari Sawaguchi
 Konshū Tsuma ga Uwaki Shimasu Episode 7 (Fuji TV, 2007), Mai Mizusawa
 Abarenbō Mama (Fuji TV, 2007), Yae Kominami
 Kimi Hannin Janai Yone? Episode 4 (TV Asahi, 2008), Risa Kamogawa
 Yasuko to Kenji (NTV, 2008), Kaori Miyazono
 Shōni Kyūmei (TV Asahi, 2008), Rui Higuchi
 Akai Ito (Fuji TV, 2008), Machiko Ishikawa
 Konkatsu! Episode 3 (Fuji TV, 2009), Anri Kaneko
 Zettai Reido: Mikaiketsu Jiken Tokumei Sōsa (Fuji TV, 2010), Ryōko Takamine
 Ōgon no Buta: Kaikei Kensachō Tokubetsu Chōsaka (NTV, 2010), Mizore Tsutsumi
 Zettai Reido: Tokushu Hanzai Sennyū Sōsa (Fuji TV, 2011), Ryōko Takamine
 Hunter: Sono Onnatachi, Shōkin Kasegi (KTV, 2011), Akane Isaka
 Hayami-san to Yobareru Hi (Fuji TV, 2012), Aki Irie
 Toshi Densetsu no Onna Episode 5 (TV Asahi, 2012), Sakura Ōkusu
 Tokyo Airport: Tokyo Kūkō Kansei Hoanbu (Fuji TV, 2012), Reiko Jōnouchi
 Galileo Season 2 (Fuji TV, 2013), Harumi Wakayama
 Andō Lloyd: A.I. knows Love? (TBS, 2013), Sakiko Komatsu
 Silent Poor (NHK, 2014), Junko Mizusawa
 Kazoku Gari (TBS, 2014), Miho Kiyooka
 Kindaichi Kōsuke vs Akechi Kogorō Futatabi (Fuji TV, 2014)
 Binta!: Bengoshi Jimuin Minowa ga Ai de Kaiketsu Shimasu (YTV, 2014), Natsumi Takada
 Renzoku Drama W Episode 47 "Scapegoat" (WOWOW, 2015), Tsukasa Matsumoto
 Yōkoso, Wagaya e (Fuji TV, 2015), Setsuko Nishizawa
 Yamegoku: Yakuza Yamete Itadakimasu (TBS, 2015), Shōko Aridome
 Risk no Kamisama (Fuji TV, 2015), Yuka Tachibana
 Kōnodori (TBS, 2015), Megumi Arai
 Naotora: The Lady Warlord (NHK, 2017), Natsu
 The Supporting Actors (TV Tokyo, 2017), Herself
 Yuganda Hamon (NHK, 2019)
 Radiation House (2019–2021)
 Welcome Home, Monet (NHK, 2021), Mikako Takahashi
 Soar High! (NHK, 2023), Jun Misono

Bibliography

Photobooks
 "Tokimeki Memorial" Photobook(Summer Memory) (July 1997), Wani Books, 
 Precious (May 1998), Wani Books, 
 Fragile (8 September 2000), Shueisha, 
 Gekkan Yamaguchi Sayaka(Shincho Mook) (April 2003), Shinchosha, 

Discography

 Albums 
 Romantic (Pioneer LDC, 26 May 1999)

 Singles 
 Baby Moon (Pioneer LDC, 24 June 1998)
 Little Wing (Pioneer LDC, 28 October 1998)
 Akai Hana: Missing You (Pioneer LDC, 16 December 1998)
 April Fool (Pioneer LDC, 28 April 1999)
 100%Love (Pioneer LDC, 24 May 2000)
 Toy Ring: Love Me 100%!'' (Antinos Records, 7 March 2001)

References

External links 
  
Sayaka Yamaguchi TV appearances 
 

1980 births
Living people
Japanese actresses
Actors from Fukuoka Prefecture
Horikoshi High School alumni